Estêvão is a Portuguese male given name, derived from Greek Στέφανος (Stéphanos) and related to the English names Steven and Stephen. It may refer to:

 Estevão Martins de Leomil (fl. 13th century), Portuguese nobleman, Lord of Couto de Leomil
 Estêvão da Gama (15th century) (1430–1497), Portuguese knight and father of Vasco da Gama
 Estêvão da Gama (c. 1470), Portuguese navigator and explorer
 Estêvão Gomes (1483-1538), Portuguese cartographer and explorer
 Estêvão da Gama (16th century) (1505–1576), Portuguese governor of Portuguese Gold Coast and Portuguese India
 Estêvão Pires de Alpoim (1520-1570s), Portuguese nobleman
 Estêvão de Brito (1570–1641), Portuguese composer
 Estêvão Lopes Morago (1575-1630), Spanish composer
 Estêvão Cacella (1585–1630), Portuguese Jesuit missionary
 Estêvão Gonçalves Neto (died 1627), Portuguese priest and artist
 Estevão Molnar (1915-unknown), Brazilian fencer
 Estêvão Cardoso de Avellar (1917-2009), Brazilian Catholic bishop
 Estêvão Silva (1844-1891), Brazilian painter and art teacher
 Estevão Mansidão (born 1940), Portuguese football midfielder
 Estevão Toniato (born 1979), Brazilian football defender
 Amilna Estêvão (born 1999), Angolan fashion model
 Estêvão (footballer, born 2002), Brazilian football midfielder for Internacional
 Estevão Willian (born 2007), Brazilian football winger for Palmeiras

See also
 Santo Estêvão (disambiguation)

Portuguese masculine given names